Usagi Yojimbo Book 27: A Town Called Hell is the twenty-seventh graphic novel in the ongoing Usagi Yojimbo series created by cartoonist Stan Sakai. It was published by Dark Horse Comics in 2013, collecting stories previously published in Usagi Yojimbo (vol. 3) #124 – 131.

A Town Called Hell was published in trade paperback and limited edition hardcover (limited to 350 signed and numbered copies).

Publication details

Trade Paperback Edition 

Publication Date: July 3, 2013

Format: b&w, 208 Pages; TP, 

Price: $16.99

Signed & Numbered Limited Hardcover Edition 

Publication Date: July 3, 2014

Format: b&w, 208 Pages; Ltd. HC, 

Price: $59.99

Table of Contents 

 Introduction by Geof Darrow 
 A Town Called Hell  
 Nukekubi	 
 The Sword of Narukami  
 Teru Teru Bozu  
 Encounter at Blood Tree Pass  
 Return to Hell 
 Cover Gallery
 Author Bio

Foreign Language Editions

Usagi Yojimbo 27: Miasto zwane Piekłem 

Publisher: Egmont Polska Sp. z o.o.

Publication Date: Luty 2014

Language: Polish

Usagi Yojimbo nº 27: Una ciudad llamada Infierno 

Publisher: Planeta DeAgostini

Publication Date: Febrero 2014

Language: Spanish

References

2013 graphic novels
Usagi Yojimbo